Elmalı is a village in the Yedisu District, Bingöl Province, Turkey. The village is populated by Kurds of the Botikan tribe and had a population of 294 in 2021.

The hamlets of Aşağı Dikmen, Dikan, Gazi, Gelincim, İbiş, Karburun, Kılıçlı, Ömürlü, Yazpınar, Yukarı Dikman and Yumrukaya are attached to the village.

References 

Villages in Yedisu District
Kurdish settlements in Bingöl Province